The Samanthurai Polling Division is a Polling Division in the Ampara Electoral District, in the Eastern Province, Sri Lanka.

Presidential Election Results

Summary 

The winner of Samanthurai has matched the final country result 5 out of 8 times. Hence, Samanthurai is a Weak Bellwether for Presidential Elections.

2019 Sri Lankan Presidential Election

2015 Sri Lankan Presidential Election

2010 Sri Lankan Presidential Election

2005 Sri Lankan Presidential Election

1999 Sri Lankan Presidential Election

1994 Sri Lankan Presidential Election

1988 Sri Lankan Presidential Election

1982 Sri Lankan Presidential Election

Parliamentary Election Results

Summary 

The winner of Samanthurai has matched the final country result 4 out of 7 times. Hence, Samanthurai is a Weak Bellwether for Parliamentary Elections.

2015 Sri Lankan Parliamentary Election

2010 Sri Lankan Parliamentary Election

2004 Sri Lankan Parliamentary Election

2001 Sri Lankan Parliamentary Election

2000 Sri Lankan Parliamentary Election

1994 Sri Lankan Parliamentary Election

1989 Sri Lankan Parliamentary Election

Demographics

Ethnicity 

The Samanthurai Polling Division has a Moor majority (83.4%) and a significant Sri Lankan Tamil population (15.0%) . In comparison, the Ampara Electoral District (which contains the Samanthurai Polling Division) has a Moor plurality (43.4%), a significant Sinhalese population (38.9%) and a significant Sri Lankan Tamil population (17.3%)

Religion 

The Samanthurai Polling Division has a Muslim majority (83.4%) and a significant Hindu population (13.4%) . In comparison, the Ampara Electoral District (which contains the Samanthurai Polling Division) has a Muslim plurality (43.4%), a significant Buddhist population (38.7%) and a significant Hindu population (15.8%)

References 

Polling Divisions of Sri Lanka
Polling Divisions of the Digamadulla Electoral District